The Best of Chicago: 40th Anniversary is a double greatest hits album, and the thirty-first album overall, by American rock band Chicago, released by Rhino Records on October 2, 2007. It consists of two discs containing 30 of Chicago's top 40 singles. It is the fourth compilation of past hits released by their label since beginning of the decade. Most of the songs on this compilation are presented as their shorter length radio-single edits, as opposed to the album versions. It also features "Love Will Come Back" without Rascal Flatts' vocals.

The 39 tracks of The Very Best of Chicago: Only the Beginning holds all the tracks of 40th Anniversary except for the tracks 13-15 on disc 2.

Although no indication is given on the discs or the cover, the album could also be considered as Chicago XXXI (31) in their canon, as it is preceded by Chicago XXX (30) in 2006, and followed by Chicago XXXII: Stone of Sisyphus in 2008. This is further emphasized by the display of albums on the band's website.

Track listing

Personnel

Chicago

Dawayne Bailey – guitar, vocals
Peter Cetera – bass, vocals
Bill Champlin – guitar, keyboards, vocals, group member
Donnie Dacus – guitar, vocals
Laudir DeOliveira – percussion, congas, vocals
Bruce Gaitsch – guitar
Keith Howland – guitar, vocals, group member
Tris Imboden – drums, group member
Terry Kath – guitar, vocals
Robert Lamm – keyboards, vocals, lyrics, songwriting, group member
Lee Loughnane – trumpet, flugelhorn, vocals, lyrics, songwriting, group member
James Pankow – trombone, vocals, lyrics, songwriting, group member
Walter Parazaider – vocals, woodwinds, lyrics, songwriting, group member
Chris Pinnick – guitar
Jason Scheff – bass, vocals, group member
Daniel Seraphine – percussion, drums, vocals

Production

Producer – Jay DeMarcus, David Foster, James William Guercio, James Newton Howard, Ron Nevison, Phil Ramone, Chas Sandford, Mike Engstrom, Cheryl Pawelski
Album cover design – Mark Paul Rosenmeier
Design – Joshua Banker, Don Jr. Garlock, Vincent Gonzales, Jim Jamitis, Jean Krikorian, Arnaud Leger, Al Mainwaring, Craig Stevens, Ashley Underwood
Photography – Jimmy Katz
Remastering – David Donnelly
Liner notes – Bill DeYoung
Product Manager – Mike Engstrom
Project assistant – Scott Webber
Supervisor – Jeff Magid
Editorial Supervision – Vanessa Atkins, Sheryl Farber
Annotation – Steve Woolard

References

2007 greatest hits albums
Rhino Records compilation albums
Albums produced by Bruce Fairbairn
Albums produced by Phil Ramone
Albums produced by James William Guercio
Albums produced by David Foster
Albums produced by Ron Nevison
Chicago (band) compilation albums